Hugo Cid Sánchez (born July 3, 1991) is a former Mexican professional footballer.

Honours
Veracruz
Copa MX: Clausura 2016

External links

1991 births
Living people
Footballers from Veracruz
Association football defenders
Mexican footballers
La Piedad footballers
C.D. Veracruz footballers
Liga MX players